Noemí Ferré Fernández (born 24 November 1991) is a Spanish professional racing cyclist, who most recently rode for UCI Women's Continental Team .

References

External links
 

1991 births
Living people
Spanish female cyclists
Place of birth missing (living people)